Ezhilan Naganathan is an Indian Tamil medical practitioner, social activist and politician from the Dravida Munnetra Kazhagam (DMK). Since May 2021, he has been serving as a member of the Tamil Nadu Legislative Assembly from Thousand Lights constituency.

Early life 
Ezhilan was born to parents with strong Dravidian ideologies, Professor Dr. M. Naganathan and Professor Dr. Santhi Naganathan. Professor M. Naganathan was a close associate of Ex-Chief Minister of Tamil Nadu M Karunanidhi for over 40 years and served as the Vice-Chairman of Tamil Nadu State Planning Commission from 2006-2011. Dr. Ezhilan was entrusted with the responsibility of complete medical care of Kalaignar for nearly a decade.

Ezhilan graduated from Don Bosco Matriculation Higher Secondary School, Chennai. He was a serious student and talented young dancer. Ezhilan completed his under-graduate and post-graduate studies in Medicine from Madras Medical College (MMC).

During his time at MMC, he was decorated with the B Bruan Medical Award and Edward Norraday Award for academic excellence in the field of medicine. He was a gold medalist in his class for medicine in the year 2007. Ezhilan was force behind protests that fought for an increase in the minimum pay of post-graduate students. Ezhilan was instrumental in establishing an exclusive poison control centre in MMC, that contributes to saving thousands of lives of farmers from snakes, scorpions, rats and pesticides across Tamil Nadu.

Career 
Ezhilan has run a private clinic in Teynampet, Chennai since the 2000s to provide free medical assistance for the poor. served at CSI Kalyani Mission Hospital, Chennai for 10 years. He was a consulting physician at Aswenee Hospital at Poes Garden, Chennai. He also consults at Kauvery Hospital, Alwarpet Chennai.

He has mentored 40 post-graduate students who became practising professionals across India.

Activist 
He is the founder of NGO MAX Medical Foundation. It is committed to educating Tamil Nadu youth in imparting the value of scientific temperament and eradicating superstitions. His organization is in the forefront of aiding the poor. He conducts statewide health camps and first aid centres. He is a Rotarian and won two district awards as the Director of Public Health for his work among AIDS-affected children and transgender communities. He is a founder of Illaignar Iyamkkam youth organization - a NGO that works for education and empowerment of the youth of Tamil Nadu about science, social justice and equality.

Politics 

Ezhilan and family are Periarists. They believe in Dravidan ideologies and follow the path of Arignar Anna and Thandhai Periyar on secularism and social justice.

Ezhilan joined Dravida Munnetra Kazhagam (DMK) party to run for Tamil Nadu State Assembly Elections 2021 from Thousand Lights Constituency, Chennai.

Ezhilan advocates for the importance of social justice, scientific temperament, secularism and state autonomy across Tamil Nadu.

He opposed exclusionary policies such as NEET, NEP, NRC, CAA through statewide protest, public gatherings, meetings and TV shows. He opposed all the majoritarian policies of the central and state government during 2016-2021. He has been a guest speaker and participated in many debates and interviews in Regional and National television in India, on topics surrounding social justice, state government’s policies on inclusion and education. DMK was responsible for bringing NEET to Tamil Nadu.

Ezhilan is a familiar face, expressed in TheNewsminute article.

His causes include the Sri Lankan Tamil Independence movement and the Kudankulam nuclear power plant protests.

Electoral performance

References

Tamil Nadu MLAs 2021–2026
Indian politicians
People from Chennai
Living people
Year of birth missing (living people)